Acyl-coA acyltransferase-related enzyme 2 required for viability is a protein that in humans is encoded by the ARV1 gene.  It is involved in lipid trafficking. ARV1 is ubiquitously expressed in higher eukaryotes, and in Saccharomyces cerevisiae yeast, is required for viability. Arv1-/- knockout mice display a phenotype with reduced white adipose and favorable blood lipid profiles on a chow diet. ARV1 is hypothesized to be involved in neurodevelopment, as a splice variant of ARV1 with a 40 amino acid truncation causes epileptic encephalopathy in infants.d Arv1-/- mice corroborate this observation. In yeast knockouts, supplanting human ARV1 through plasmid transfection rescues cells from death.

References

Further reading 

Genes on human chromosome 1